Gaius Rubellius Blandus was a Roman senator who lived during the Principate. Blandus was the grandson of Rubellius Blandus of Tibur, a member of the Equestrian class, who was the first Roman to teach rhetoric. He was suffect consul from August to December AD 18 with Marcus Vipstanus Gallus as his colleague. In AD 33, he married Julia Livia, granddaughter of the Roman emperor Tiberius.

Career
As the first member of his family to be admitted to the Senate, Blandus is considered a homo novus. His cursus honorum is documented in several inscriptions found in North Africa. Blandus began his career with the singular honor of being quaestor in service to the emperor Augustus; two more of the traditional Republican magistracies followed, plebeian tribune and praetor. Two years after he served as suffect consul, he was involved with the prosecution of Aemilia Lepida, putting forward a motion in the senate to outlaw her which carried.

The primary sources disagree when Blandus was admitted to the prestigious College of Pontiffs, whether it was before or after his consulate; one inscription lists it before, while two list it afterwards. Hoffman notes Blandus "probably received the priesthood late because of his low birth." Despite his background, Blandus achieved what came to be the pinnacle of a successful senatorial career, proconsular governor of Africa in 35/36. Upon returning to Rome, Blandus was selected as one of four members of a commission to assess damage a fire had caused in Rome earlier that year.

Marriages and family
Blandus appears to have had a daughter named Rubellia Bassa from an earlier marriage. In the year 33 he married Julia Livia, one of the princesses of the Imperial house. Despite the fact that Blandus had been suffect consul in 18, the match was considered a social disaster; Tacitus includes the event in a list of "the many sorrows which saddened Rome", which otherwise consisted of deaths of different prominent people. Ronald Syme identifies the historian's reaction as "the tone and sentiments of a man enslaved to the standards of class and rank." Julia was the daughter of Livilla and Drusus Julius Caesar, and the granddaughter of Emperor Tiberius. The marriage produced at least one child, a boy, Rubellius Plautus, who was considered as a rival to Emperor Nero. Two further children are uncertain: a single inscription refers to a Rubellius Drusus, who died before his third birthday, while Juvenal implies the existence of another son, also named Gaius Rubellius Blandus.

See also 
 List of Roman consuls

References 

1st-century Romans
Suffect consuls of Imperial Rome
Imperial Roman praetors
Roman quaestors
Tribunes of the plebs
Roman governors of Africa
Julio-Claudian dynasty
Rubellii
Year of birth unknown
Year of death unknown